Dan Weiss (born March 4, 1977) is an American jazz drummer and composer who lives in Brooklyn, New York, United States.

Background 
Dan Weiss was raised in New Jersey. He moved to New York City to attend Manhattan School of Music, where he studied with John Riley. He majored in jazz percussion with a minor in classical composition. Weiss has also studied tabla with guru Pandit Samir Chatterjee.

Weiss's intense study of jazz, classical Indian, contemporary classical, West African, and metal creates a sound that transcends conventional style or genre. His compositional trademarks are angular yet emotive melodies; long rhythmic cycles native to many non-western music, complex through-composed drum parts, and melodic shapes that draw directly from the raga system found in Indian classical music.

As a leader, Weiss has released several albums under his own name and with his piano trio. He is also the leader of Starebaby, a group that blends heavy metal and electronic music with improvised elements of jazz.

As a sideman, he has toured with Lee Konitz, Chris Potter, Kenny Werner, Rudresh Mahanthappa, David Binney, and many others

He has been a Rising Star winner in the 60th and 61st Annual Downbeat Critic Polls and has been called one of "Five Jazz Drummers to Watch" by The New York Times.

Discography

As a leader 
 2004 Tintal Drumset Solo (Pi Recordings)
 2005 Now Yes When (Pi Recordings)
 2010 Timshel (Pi Recordings)
 2010 Jhaptal Drumset Solo  (Pi Recordings)
 2014 Fourteen (Pi Recordings)
 2016 Sixteen: Drummers Suite (Pi Recordings)
 2018 Starebaby (Pi Recordings)
 2019 Utica Box Dan Weiss Trio plus 1 (Sunnyside)
 2020 Natural Selection (W Starebaby) (Pi Recordings)

As a sideman 
 2020 Noah Preminger Contemptment
 2020 Ohad Talmor Long Forms
 2020 Tineke Postma Freya
 2018 Michael Dessen Somewhere In The Upstream
 2018 Misha Tsiganov Playing with the Wind
 2009 Rez Abbasi Things To Come 
 2009 Miles Okazaki Generations
 2008 Rudresh Mahanthappa's Indo-Pak Coalition Apti
 2006 David Binney Cities And Desire
 2006 Rudresh Mahanthappa Codebook
 2006 Miles Okazaki Mirror
 2006 Rez Abbasi Bazaar
 2005 Rez Abbasi Snake Charmer
 2005 David Binney Bastion Of Sanity

References 

1977 births
Living people
American jazz drummers
Manhattan School of Music alumni
Musicians from Brooklyn
Jazz musicians from New York (state)